Neeyum Njanum is a 2019 Indian Malayalam-language romance film written and directed by A. K. Sajan. It stars Sharaf U Dheen, Anu Sithara and Siju Wilson. The film was produced by Siyad Koker under the banner of Kokers Films, in association with Lamp Movies. Neeyum Njanum was released in Kerala on 18 January 2019 by Kokers Films.

Cast 

 Sharaf U Dheen as Yakub Mohammed, Hashmi husband 
 Anu Sithara as Hashmi Anzari, Yakub wife and Shanu love interest
 Siju Wilson as Shanu Khalid, Hashmi love interest 
 Aju Varghese as Abbas
 Vishnu Unnikrishnan as Ganapathi
 Poojitha Menon as Chithra Prasad
 Shaheen Siddique as Noushad
 Surabhi Lakshmi as Subhadrakutty
 Srikant Murali as Nampiri Mash
Shyam Jacob as Hyder
Sohan Seenulal as Const.Joseph
Aji John as Soofi
 Sowmya Menon as Saniya
 Dileesh Pothan as S.I Kanan
 Sijoy Varghese
 Kalabhavan Haneef
 Sadiq
Manuraj as Manuji
 Shobi Thilakan
Santhakumari as Taj Itha
Dini Daniel
Veena Nair as Sreya
 Mohanlal (narration)

Production 
The film was launched in Kozhikode on 29 August 2018 followed by the start of principal photography. The film was primarily shot in Kozhikode and Palakkad and few scenes been shot in Mumbai and Dubai. By the beginning of October, the crew wrapped up the shoot in Kerala and moved to Mumbai. After which they moved to Dubai in November 2018. Entire filming was completed by mid-November.

Release
Neeyum Njanum was released in Kerala on 18 January 2019 by Kokers Films.

Critical reception
The Times of India rated 3.5 out of 5 stars and wrote: "Neeyum Njanum is a narrative of our time, touching on themes of moral policing, religion, and politics. He [A. K. Sajan] uses sharp wit and wry sarcasm as his story telling tools, making it a somewhat intelligent cinema".

Soundtrack
The songs were composed by Vinu Thomas and the lyrics were penned by B. K. Harinarayanan and Salaudheen Kechery.

1 "Kunkumanira" - Shreya Ghoshal
2 "Aalam" - Mridula Warrier
3 "Ishq Kondu" - Najim Arshad, Abhirami Ajay
4 "En Roohin" - Amal Antony
5 "Thedunna Theeram" - Amal Antony
6 "Koottilay" - Abhirami Ajay
7 "Alam" (M)- Arun Alat

References

External links 
 
 Trailer

2010s Malayalam-language films
Indian romance films
2019 romance films
Films shot in Palakkad
Films shot in Kozhikode
Films shot in Dubai
Films shot in the United Arab Emirates
Films set in Dubai
Films directed by A. K. Sajan